Club Deportivo Tercio was a military football team based in the autonomous city of Melilla. They played in Primera Autonómica de Melilla before being dissolved in 2016.

Season to season

External links
femefutbol.com profile 

Football clubs in Melilla
Divisiones Regionales de Fútbol clubs
2016 disestablishments in Spain
Association football clubs disestablished in 2016